National Route 467 is a national highway of Japan connecting Yamato, Kanagawa and Fujisawa, Kanagawa in Japan, with a total length of 21.6 km (13.42 mi).

References

National highways in Japan
Roads in Kanagawa Prefecture